Her lothly lere [unwanted complexion]
Is nothing clear,
But ugly of cheer,
Droopy and drowsy,
Scurvy and lousy;
Her face all bowsy [bloated by drink]
Comely crinkled,
Wondersly wrinkled,
Like a roast pig's ear,
Bristled with hear. [hair]

-- Lines 12-21, "The Tunnyng of Elynour Rummyng" by John Skelton. The poem is thought to have been first published this year. 

Nationality words link to articles with information on the nation's poetry or literature (for instance, Irish or France).

Events

Works published

 Anonymous,  ("A Book of a Ghostly Father"), London: Wynkyn de Worde 1520 has also been suggested as the most likely year of publication)
 Anonymous, Christmas Carols, including "" and ""
 Alexander Barclay, The Boke of Codrus and Mynalcas, the author's "Fourth Eclog" (see also Eclogues 1530, Fifth Eclogue 1518)
 Henry Bradshaw, The Life of St. Werburgh
 Andrew Chertsey, The Passyon of Oure Lorde, translated from French with additional verses interspersed in the text
 Robert Copland, English:
 Introductory poem to The Passyon of Our Lorde, London: Wynkyn de Worde
 Introductory verse to The Myrrour & the Chyrche, London: Wynkyn de Worde
 Marko Marulić, Judita ("Judith"), Croatian poem, a landmark in Croatian literature, printed in Venice by Guglielmo da Fontaneto on August 13, and published three times during the author's life (written in 1501)
 John Skelton, "The Tunnyng of Elynour Rummyng", publication year uncertain (reprinted in Skelton's Certain Books 1545)

Births
Death years link to the corresponding "[year] in poetry" article:
 Anne Askew born about this year, also spelled "Anne Ayscough" (died 1546), English poet and Protestant martyr who was persecuted as a heretic; the only woman on record to have been tortured in the Tower of London, before being burnt at the stake
 Sir Thomas Chaloner the elder (died 1565), English
 Jorge de Montemayor, year uncertain (died 1561), Portuguese novelist and poet, who wrote almost exclusively in Spanish
 Pontus de Tyard born about this year (died 1605), French, poet and priest, a member of "La Pléiade"
 Song Deokbong (died 1578), Korean poet
 Xu Wei (died 1593), Chinese painter, poet and dramatist

Deaths
Birth years link to the corresponding "[year] in poetry" article:
 May 10 – Sebastian Brant (born c.1457), German

See also

 Poetry
 16th century in poetry
 16th century in literature
 French Renaissance literature
 Renaissance literature
 Spanish Renaissance literature

Notes

16th-century poetry
Poetry